Sta Muhabbat Me Zindagi Da (English; Your love is my life) is a Pashto 2017's romantic film made by A.K Khan. It was released on 26 June 2017 on Eid al-Fitr.

References

Pashto-language films
2017 films
Pakistani romance films
2017 romance films